The Open di Puglia e Basilicata is an annual professional golf tournament held in Riva dei Tessali, near Castellaneta, Italy.

First held in 1983, there was a brief hiatus before the second edition in 1986. The tournament became part of the second tier Challenge Tour schedule in 1991, where it remained until 2007. Since 2008, it has been an event on the third tier Alps Tour. It also forms part of the Italian Pro Tour.

Prior to 2003, it was solely hosted at Riva dei Tessali Golf Club, but since then it has been jointly held at Metaponto Golf Club.

Winners

Notes

External links
Official coverage on the Challenge Tour's official site
List of past winners on the Riva dei Tessali site

Former Challenge Tour events
Golf tournaments in Italy